Dr. Samuel Adams (1730 – January, 1810) was a physician, surgeon, farmer, land owner, and loyalist soldier, from Arlington, Vermont.

Early life
Samuel Adams was born in Stratford, Fairfield County, Connecticut Colony, British North America, British Empire, now Stratford, Fairfield County, Connecticut, in 1730.

New Hampshire Grants
In 1764, he moved with his family to Arlington in the New Hampshire Grants. On several occasions, Adams served as representative and negotiator, for Arlington and the other surrounding towns.

Conflict with Green Mountain Boys
In 1774, Adams came into conflict with Ethan Allen's Green Mountain Boys for dissenting with their land title policy. After a brief trial, Adams' captors had him tied to a chair and hung from the sign post, of the Catamount Tavern, as a public humiliation.

American Revolutionary War service
In 1776, Dr. Adams was captured by Whigs, for his British Loyalist sympathies and he and his sons were imprisoned. Adams escaped and fled north, to Canada, reaching the British lines, in Quebec. Joining the King's Army, Adams served, during the Battle of Valcour Island, during Lake Champlain Campaign, in 1776 and raised an independent, Loyalist company, known as Adams' Rangers, which served, under British General  John Burgoyne, in the Saratoga campaign of 1777. Four of Adams' sons served in his ranger company, with his eldest son Gideon Adams, acting as ensign.

Exile in British Canada
Following the war, Adams and his sons settled in the province of Upper Canada now present-day Southeastern Ontario, Canada alongside other disbanded British Loyalist troops and their families. Adams ran a tavern in Montreal, serving British troops and expatriates.

Death
In January, 1810, Samuel Adams died in Edwardsburgh, Upper Canada, British North America, British Empire, now Edwardsburgh, Ontario, Canada,
at the age of 80.

References

 Adams, Robert Train and Douglass Graem Adams.  A Family Record of Dr. Samuel Adams, United Empire Loyalist of Vermont and Upper Canada: The First Five Generations Descending from William Adams of Ipswich (1594-1661) and the Descendants of Dr. Samuel Adams of Arlington, (1730-1810).  R.T. Adams, 1995.  
 Fryer, Mary Beacock.  Kings Men, the Soldier Founders of Ontario.  Toronto:  Dundurn Press, 1980.
 Mathews, Hazel C.  Frontier Spies; the British Secret Service, Northern Department, during the Revolutionary War.  Fort Myers, FL:  Ace Press, 1971.
 Palmer, Gregory.  Biographical sketches of Loyalists in the American Revolution.  Westport, CT:  Meckler Publishing, 1984.

External links
 vermonthistory.org page on Samuel Adams with illustration

United Empire Loyalists
Loyalist military personnel of the American Revolutionary War
Loyalists in the American Revolution from Connecticut
People from Stratford, Connecticut
1730 births
1810 deaths
British America army officers